The First Dreyer cabinet was the state government of the German state of Rhineland-Palatinate from 16 January 2013 until 18 May 2016. The Cabinet was headed by Minister President Malu Dreyer and was formed by the Social Democratic Party and the Alliance 90/The Greens, after the resignation of minister president Kurt Beck. On 16 January 2013 Dreyer was elected and sworn in as Minister President by the Landtag of Rhineland-Palatinate. 
It was succeeded by Dreyers's second and third cabinets.

The cabinet comprises 10 ministers including the Minister-President. Seven are members of the SPD, three are members of the Greens.

Composition 

|}

References 

Cabinets of Rhineland-Palatinate
2013 establishments in Germany
2016 disestablishments in Germany